St Michael's Catholic School is a Catholic all-through voluntary aided school located in High Wycombe, Buckinghamshire, England. In 2016 the school had 1124 pupils. It enrols children aged 3 through 19.

The school's catchment area for many years has included Aylesbury and surrounding areas, which has a high proportion of baptised Catholics.

History
The school was founded in 1973 as St Bernard's Catholic School as a satellite of St Bernard's Catholic Grammar School in Slough.

According to the BBC's Domesday Project, in 1986 the school had 840 pupils between the ages of 11 and 16. The buildings were reported to have been 10 years old at the time, in front of extensive playing fields on a site of 17 acres.

In September 2008, St Bernard's Catholic School was awarded specialist school status as a Science College, by the Department for Children, Schools and Families (DCSF).

In 2011, the school amalgamated with neighbouring Catholic primary school St Augustine's Catholic Primary, creating an all-through school called St Augustine's and St Bernard's Catholic School. In the same year, the school was among 494 schools nationwide praised by the Specialist Schools and Academies Trust for its fast improvement of GCSE results. The number of pupils receiving five A* – C grades, including in English and Maths, increased from 42 per cent in 2009 to 64 per cent in 2011.

From September 2012, the school stopped being called St Augustine's and St Bernard's Catholic School and is now known by its current name.

In February 2017, it was announced that the school was proposing the creation of a satellite school at the Aylesbury Vale Academy's former site due to lack of space and population increase predictions. At the time the proposals were made, the school was expected to open in September 2018 with a Year 7 intake of 120 students. In September 2019, the new buildings were opened, with students relocating to the facility.

Houses
The school has five houses, named after five Apostles.

References

External links

Department for Education Performance Tables 2011

Catholic secondary schools in the Diocese of Northampton
Secondary schools in Buckinghamshire
Voluntary aided schools in England
High Wycombe
Educational institutions established in 1973
1973 establishments in England
Catholic primary schools in the Diocese of Northampton
Primary schools in Buckinghamshire